The Irish elk (Megaloceros giganteus), also called the giant deer or Irish deer, is an extinct species of deer in the genus Megaloceros and is one of the largest deer that ever lived. Its range extended across Eurasia during the Pleistocene, from Ireland to Lake Baikal in Siberia. The most recent remains of the species have been carbon dated to about 7,700 years ago in western Russia.

The Irish elk is known from abundant skeletal remains which have been found in bogs in Ireland. It is not closely related to either of the living species currently called elk: Alces alces (the European elk, known in North America as the moose) or Cervus canadensis (the North American elk or wapiti). For this reason, the name "giant deer" is used in some publications, instead of "Irish elk". Although one study suggested that the Irish elk was closely related to the red deer (Cervus elaphus), most other phylogenetic analyses support the thesis that their closest living relatives are fallow deer (Dama).

Taxonomy

Research history

The first scientific descriptions of the animal's remains were made by Irish physician Thomas Molyneux in 1695, who identified large antlers from Dardistown, Dublin—which were apparently commonly unearthed in Ireland—as belonging to the elk (known as the moose in North America), concluding that it was once abundant on the island. It was first formally named as Alce gigantea by Johann Friedrich Blumenbach in his Handbuch der Naturgeschichte in 1799, with Alce being a variant of Alces, the Latin name for the elk. The original Blumenbach's description of Alce gigantea provides rather scant information about the species, specifying only that this particular kind of "fossil elk" comes from Ireland and is characterized by immense body size. According to Blumenbach, the distance between summits of giant deer antlers may attain 14 feet (approximately 4.4 m). This particular feature mentioned by Blumenbach permitted to Roman Croitor to identify the type specimen of giant deer  that was figured and described for the first time in Louthiana of Thomas Wright. The holotype of Megaloceros giganteus (Blumenbach, 1799) is a well-preserved male skull with exceptionally large antlers found in Dunleer environs (County Louth, Ireland). The type specimen of giant deer is currently exposed in Barmeath Castle where Thomas Wright first saw and described it.

French scientist Georges Cuvier documented in 1812 that the Irish elk did not belong to any species of mammal currently living, declaring it "le plus célèbre de tous les ruminans fossiles" (the most famous of all fossil ruminants). In 1827 Joshua Brookes, in a listing of his zoological collection, named the new genus Megaloceros (spelled Megalocerus in the earlier editions) in the following passage:

The etymology being from Greek:   "great" +   "horn, antler". The type and only species named in the description being Megaloceros antiquorum, based on Irish remains now considered to belong to M. giganteus, making the former a junior synonym. The original description was considered by Adrian Lister in 1987 to be inadequate for a taxonomic definition. In 1828 Brookes published an expanded list in the form of a catalogue for an upcoming auction, which included the Latin phrase "Cornibus deciduis palmatis" as a description of the remains. The 1828 publication was approved by International Commission on Zoological Nomenclature (ICZN) in 1977 as an available publication for the basis of zoological nomenclature. Adrian Lister in 1987 judged that "the phase "Cornibus deciduis palmatis" constitutes a definition sufficient under the [International Code of Zoological Nomenclature] (article 12) to validate Megalocerus." The original spelling of Megalocerus was never used after its original publication.In 1844 Richard Owen named another synonym of the Irish elk, including it within the newly named subgenus Megaceros, Cervus (Megaceros) hibernicus. This has been suggested to be derived from another junior synonym of the Irish elk described by J. Hart in 1825, Cervus megaceros. Despite being a junior synonym, Megaloceros remained in obscurity and Megaceros became the common genus name for the taxon. The combination "Megaceros giganteus" was in use by 1871. George Gaylord Simpson in 1945 revived the original Megaloceros name, which became progressively more widely used, until a taxonomic decision in 1989 by the ICZN confirmed the priority of Megaloceros over Megaceros, and Megaloceros to be the correct spelling.

Before the 20th century, the Irish elk, having evolved from smaller ancestors with smaller antlers, was taken as a prime example of orthogenesis (directed evolution), an evolutionary mechanism opposed to Darwinian evolution in which the successive species within the lineage become increasingly modified in a single undeviating direction, evolution proceeding in a straight line void of natural selection. Orthogenesis was claimed to have caused an evolutionary trajectory towards antlers that became larger and larger, eventually causing the species' extinction because the antlers grew to sizes which inhibited proper feeding habits and caused the animal to become trapped in tree branches. In the 1930s, orthogenesis was disputed by Darwinians led by Julian Huxley, who noted that antler size was not grossly large, and was proportional to body size. The currently favoured view is that sexual selection was the driving force behind the large antlers rather than orthogenesis or natural selection.

Evolution

M. giganteus belongs to the genus Megaloceros. Megaloceros is a member of the possibly polyphyletic (invalid) tribe "Megalocerini" or "Megacerini", alongside Megaceroides, Praemegaceros, Eucladoceros and Sinomegaceros, which are often collectively referred to as "giant deer". The taxonomy of giant deer lacks consensus, with genus names used for species varying substantially between authors. The earliest possible record of the genus is a partial antler from the Early Pleistocene MN 17 (2.5–1.8 Ma) of Stavropol Krai in the North Caucasus of Russia, which were given the name of M. stavropolensis in 2016, however this species has been subsequently suggested to belong to Arvernoceros. or Sinomegaceros. The oldest generally accepted records of the genus are from the late Early Pleistocene. Other species often considered to belong to Megaloceros include the reindeer sized M. savini, which is known from early Middle Pleistocene (~700,000–450,000 years ago) localities in England, France, Spain and Germany, and the more recently described species M. novocarthaginiensis, which is known from late Early Pleistocene (0.9–0.8 Ma) localities in Spain, and the small M. matritensis endemic to the Iberian peninsula during the late Middle Pleistocene (~400,000 to 250,000 years ago), which overlaps chronologically with the earliest M. giganteus records. Jan van der Made proposed these species to be chronospecies, due to shared morphological characteristics not found in M. giganteus and gradual transition of morphological characters through time. M. savini and related species have also been suggested to comprise the separate genus Praedama by Roman Croitor. Croitor has suggested closer affinities to Eucladoceros for M. savini and related species. 

The origin of M. giganteus remains unclear, and appears to lie outside Western Europe. Jan van der Made has suggested that remains of an indeterminate Megaloceros species from the late Early Pleistocene (~1.2 Ma) of Libakos in Greece are closer to M. giganteus than the M. novocarthaginiensis-matritensis lineage due to the shared molarisation of the lower fourth premolar (P4). Croitor has suggested that M. giganteus is closely related to what was originally described as Dama clactoniana mugharensis (which he proposes be named Megaloceros mugharensis) from the Middle Pleistocene of Tabun Cave in Israel, due to similarities in the antlers, molars and premolars. The earliest possible records of M. giganteus comes from Homersfield, England thought to be about 450,000 years ago—though the dating is uncertain. The oldest securely dated Middle Pleistocene records are those from Hoxne, England, which have been dated to Marine Isotope Stage 11 (424,000 to 374,000 years ago), other Middle Pleistocene early records include Steinheim an der Murr, Germany, (classified as M. g. antecedens) about 400,000–300,000 years ago and Swanscombe, England. Most remains of the Irish elk are known from the Late Pleistocene. A large proportion of the known remains of M. giganteus are from Ireland, which mostly date to the Allerød oscillation near the end of the Late Pleistocene around 13,000 years ago. Over 100 individuals have been found in Ballybetagh Bog near Dublin.

It has been historically thought that, because both have palmated antlers, the Irish elk and fallow deer (Dama spp.) are closely related, this is supported by several other morphological similarities, including the lack of upper canines, proportionally long braincase and nasal bones, and proportionally short front portion of the skull. In 2005, two fragments of mitochondrial DNA (mtDNA) from the cytochrome b gene were extracted and sequenced from 4 antlers and a bone, the mtDNA found that the Irish elk was nested within Cervus, and were inside the clade containing living red deer (Cervus elaphus). Based on this, the authors suggested that the Irish elk and red deer interbred. However, another study from the same year in the journal Nature utilising both fragmentary mitochondrial DNA and morphological data found that the Irish elk was indeed most closely related to Dama. The close relationship with Dama was supported by another cytochrome b study in 2006, a 2015 study involving the full mitochondrial genome, and by a 2017 morphological analysis of the bony labyrinth. The 2006 and 2017 studies also directly suggest that the results of the 2005 cytochrome b paper were the result of DNA contamination.

Description 

Nonetheless, compared to Alces, Irish elk appear to have had a more robust skeleton, with older and more mature Alces skeletons bearing some resemblance to those of prime Irish elk, and younger Irish elk resembling prime Alces. Likely due to different social structures, the Irish elk exhibits more marked sexual dimorphism than Alces, with Irish elk bucks being notably larger than does. The distinguishing characters of M. giganteus include concave frontals, proportionally long braincase, proportionally short front section of the skull (orbitofrontal region), alongside the absence of upper canines and the molarisation of the lower fourth premolar (P4). The skull and mandible of the Irish elk exhibit substantial thickening (pachyostosis), with the early and complete obliteration of cranial sutures.

Based on Upper Palaeolithic cave paintings, the Irish elk seems to have had overall light colouration, with a dark stripe running along the back, a stripe on either side from shoulder to haunch, a dark collar on the throat and a chinstrap, and a dark hump on the withers (between the shoulder blades). In 1989, American palaeontologist Dale Guthrie suggested that, like bison, the hump allowed a higher hinging action of the front legs to increase stride length while running. Valerius Geist suggested that the hump may have also been used to store fat. Localising fat rather than evenly distributing it may have prevented overheating while running or in rut during the summer.

Habitat
It was not exclusive to Ireland. Rather, it was so named because the most well-known and best-preserved fossil specimens have been found in lake sediments and peat bogs in Ireland. The Irish elk had a far-reaching range, extending from the Atlantic Ocean in the West to Lake Baikal in the East. They do not appear to have extended northward onto the open mammoth steppe, rather keeping to the boreal steppe-woodland environments, which consisted of scattered spruce and pine, as well as low-lying herbs and shrubs including grasses, sedges, Ephedra, Artemisia and Chenopodiaceae.

Palaeobiology

Physiology 

In 1998, Canadian biologist Valerius Geist hypothesised that the Irish elk was cursorial (adapted for running and stamina). He noted that the Irish elk physically resembled reindeer. The body proportions of the Irish elk are similar to those of the cursorial addax, oryx, and saiga antelope. These include the relatively short legs, the long front legs nearly as long as the hind legs, and a robust cylindrical body.

Reproduction

At Ballybetagh Bog, over 100 Irish elk individuals were found, all small antlered bucks. This indicates that bucks and does segregated during at least winter and spring. Many modern deer species do this partly because males and females have different nutritional requirements and need to consume different types of plants. Segregation would also imply a polygynous society, with stags fighting for control over harems during rut. Because most of the individuals found were juvenile or geriatric and were likely suffering from malnutrition, they probably died from winterkill. Most Irish elk specimens known may have died from winterkill, and winterkill is the highest source of mortality among many modern deer species. Bucks generally suffer higher mortality rates because they eat little during the autumn rut.

Assuming a similar response to starvation as red deer, a large, healthy Irish elk stag with  antlers would have had  antlers under poor conditions; and an average sized Irish elk stag with  antlers would have had  antlers under poorer conditions, similar sizes to the moose. This is within the range of present-day wapiti/red deer (Cervus spp.) antler weights. Irish elk antlers vary widely in form depending upon the habitat, such as a compact, upright shape in closed forest environments. Irish elk likely shed their antlers and re-grew a new pair during mating season. Antlers generally require high amounts of calcium and phosphate, especially those for stags which have larger structures, and the massive antlers of Irish elk may have required much greater quantities. Stags typically meet these requirements in part from their bones, suffering from a condition similar to osteoporosis while the antlers are growing, and replenishing them from food plants after the antlers have grown in or reclaiming nutrients from shed antlers.

The large antlers have generally been explained as being used for male-male battle during mating season. They may have also been used for display, to attract females and assert dominance against rival males. A finite element analysis of the antlers suggested that during fighting, the antlers were likely to interlock around the middle tine, the high stress when interlocking on the distal tine suggests that the fighting was likely more constrained and predictable than among extant deer, likely involving twisting motions, as is known in extant deer with palmated antlers.

In deer, gestation time generally increases with body size. A  doe may have had a gestation period of about 274 days. Based on this and patterns seen in modern deer, last year's antlers in Irish elk bucks were potentially shed in early March, peak antler growth in early June, completion by mid-July, shedding velvet (a layer of blood vessels on the antlers in-use while growing them) by late July, and the height of rut falling on the second week of August. Geist, believing the Irish elk to have been a cursorial animal, concluded that a doe would have to have produced nutrient-rich milk so that her calf would have enough energy and stamina to keep up with the herd.

Life history 

The mesodont (meaning neither high (hypsodont) or low (brachydont) crowned) condition of the teeth suggests that the species was a mixed feeder, being able to both browse and graze. Pollen remains from teeth found in the North Sea around 43,000 years old were found to be dominated by Artemisia and other Asteraceae, with minor Plantago, Helianthemum, Plumbaginaceae and Salix. A stable isotope analysis of the terminal Pleistocene Irish population suggests a grass and forb based diet, supplemented by browsing during stressed periods. Dental wear patterns of specimens from the late Middle and Late Pleistocene of Britain suggest a diet tending towards mixed feeding and grazing, but with a wide range including leaf browsing.

Based on the dietary requirements of red deer, a  lean Irish elk stag would have needed to consume  of fresh forage daily. Assuming antler growth occurred over a span of 120 days, a stag would have required 1,372 g (3 lb) of protein daily, as well as access to nutrient- and mineral-dense forage starting about a month before antlers began sprouting and continuing until they had fully grown. Such forage is not very common, and stags perhaps sought after aquatic plants in lakes. After antler growing, stags could probably satisfy their nutritional requirements in productive sedge lands bordered by willow and birch forests.

The Irish elk may have been preyed upon by the large carnivores of the time, including the cave lion, and the cave hyena.

Extinction

Outside of the Irish Late Pleistocene, remains of Irish elk are uncommon, suggesting that they were usually rare in the areas that they did occur.

Historically, its extinction has been attributed to the encumbering size of the antlers, a "maladaptation" making fleeing through forests especially difficult for males while being chased by human hunters, or being too taxing nutritionally when the vegetation makeup shifted. In these scenarios, sexual selection by does for stags with large antlers would have contributed to decline.

However, antler size decreased through the Late Pleistocene and into the Holocene, and so may not have been the primary cause of extinction. A reduction in forest density in the Late Pleistocene and a lack of sufficient high-quality forage is associated with a decrease in body and antler size. Such resource constriction may have cut female fertility rates in half. Human hunting may have forced Irish elk into suboptimal feeding grounds.

The distribution of M. giganteus is thought to have been strongly controlled by climactic conditions. The range of the Irish elk appears to have collapsed during the Last Glacial Maximum (LGM), with few remains known between 27,500 and 14,600 years ago, and none between 23,300 and 17,500 years ago. Known remains substantially increase during the latest Pleistocene, where it appears to have re-colonized most of its former range, with abundant remains in the UK, Ireland, and Germany. A 2021 study found that M. giganteus saw a progressive decline in mitochondrial genome diversity beginning around 50,000 years ago, which accelerated during the LGM.

While the range of the taxon was dramatically reduced after the Pleistocene-Holocene transition, it managed to survive into the early Northgrippian in the central part of its range within European Russia and Siberia, in a belt extending from Maloarchangelsk in the East to Preobrazhenka in the west. It is suggested that extinction was contributed to by further climatic changes transforming preferred open habitat into uninhabitable dense forest. The final demise may have been caused by several factors both on a continental and regional scale, including climate change and hunting. Lister and Stewart concluded in a study of the extinction of the Irish elk that "it seems clear that environmental factors, cumulatively over thousands of years, reduced giant deer populations to a highly vulnerable state. In this situation, even relatively low-level hunting by small human populations could have contributed to its extinction."

The most recent (uncalibrated) radiocarbon dates for M. giganteus remains are 4912-4846 BCE in Maloarchangelsk and 4901-4831 BCE in Kamyshlov, Russia.

Cultural significance 

A handful of Irish elk depictions are known from the art of the Upper Paleolithic in Europe. However, these are much less abundant than the common red deer and reindeer depictions. The bones of the Irish elk are uncommon in localities where they are found, and only a handful of examples of human interaction are known. A mandible from Ofatinţi, Moldova dating to either the Eemian or the early Late Pleistocene, "is peculiar because it has ancient tool-made notches on its lateral side". Several M. giganteus bones from the Chatelperronian levels of the Labeko Koba site in Spain are noted for bearing puncture marks, which have been interpreted as anthropogenic. A terminal Pleistocene (13710-13215 cal BP) skull from Lüdersdorf, Germany is noted to have had the antler and facial part of the skull removed in a way unlikely to be due to natural causes. A calcaneum from an associated lower hind limb from the early Holocene site of Sosnovy Tushamsky in Siberia is noted to have "two short and deep traces of cutting blows", which are interpreted as "clear evidence of butchery". The use of shed antler bases is also known, at the terminal Pleistocene (Allerød) Endingen VI site in Germany, a shed antler base appears to have been used in a way analogous to a lithic core to produce "blanks" for the manufacture of barbed projectile tips. A ring-like mark on a shed antler beam from the similarly aged Paderborn site in Germany has been suggested to be anthropogenic.

Due to the abundance of Irish elk remains in Ireland, a thriving trade in their bones existed there during the 19th century to supply museums and collectors. Skeletons and skulls with attached antlers were also prized ornaments in aristocratic homes. The remains of Irish elk were of high value: "In 1865, full skeletons might fetch £30, while particularly good heads with antlers could cost £15." with £15 being more than 30 weeks' wages for a low skilled worker at the time. Indeed Leeds Philosophical and Literary Society bought a full skeleton in 1847, from Glennon's in Dublin, for £38. This specimen, discovered at Lough Gur near Limerick, is still on display at Leeds City Museum.

A folk memory of the Irish elk was once thought to be preserved in the Middle High German word , a large beast mentioned in the 13th-century Nibelungenlied along with the then-extant aurochs ( / "After this he straightway slew a Bison and an Elk, Of the strong Wild Oxen four, and a single fierce Schelch.") This opinion is no longer widely held. The Middle Irish word  was also suggested as a reference to the Irish elk. However, these interpretations are not conclusive.

See also

References

Further reading
  (1995): Dance of the Tiger. University of California Press. .
Kurten is a paleo-anthropologist, and in this novel, he presents a theory of Neanderthal extinction. Irish elk feature prominently, under the name shelk which Kurten coins (based on the aforementioned old German schelch) to avoid the problematic aspects of "Irish" and "elk" as discussed above. The book was first published in 1980 when "Giant Deer" was not yet being used widely.
 Zoological Science 22: 1031–1044 (2005).
 Larson, Edward J. (2004). Evolution: The Remarkable History of a Scientific Theory.

External links

 
 
 
 

Prehistoric deer
Pleistocene even-toed ungulates
Pleistocene mammals of Europe
Pleistocene mammals of Asia
Pleistocene first appearances
Extinct animals of Ireland
Extinct animals of Russia
Extinct animals of China
Holocene extinctions
Taxa named by Johann Friedrich Blumenbach